Coccotrypes is a genus of typical bark beetles in the family Curculionidae. There are about six described species in Coccotrypes.

Species
 Coccotrypes advena Blandford, 1894 (seed borer)
 Coccotrypes carpophagus (Hornung, 1842)
 Coccotrypes cyperi Wood & Bright, 1992
 Coccotrypes dactyliperda (Fabricius, 1801) (date stone borer)
 Coccotrypes distinctus (Motschulsky, 1866)
 Coccotrypes indicus (Eggers, 1936)
 Coccotrypes persicae (Hopkins, 1915)

References

 Poole, Robert W., and Patricia Gentili, eds. (1996). "Coleoptera". Nomina Insecta Nearctica: A Check List of the Insects of North America, vol. 1: Coleoptera, Strepsiptera, 41-820.

Further reading

 NCBI Taxonomy Browser, Coccotrypes
 Arnett, R.H. Jr., M. C. Thomas, P. E. Skelley and J. H. Frank. (eds.). (2002). American Beetles, Volume II: Polyphaga: Scarabaeoidea through Curculionoidea. CRC Press LLC, Boca Raton, FL.
 
 Richard E. White. (1983). Peterson Field Guides: Beetles. Houghton Mifflin Company.

Scolytinae
Curculionidae genera